Fathead (subtitled Ray Charles Presents David 'Fathead' Newman and also referred to as Ray Charles Sextet) is the debut release of jazz saxophonist David "Fathead" Newman recorded in 1958 but not released until 1960 on the Atlantic label.    The complete album was also included with 3 other Newman releases in the 2 CD reissue / compilation, It's Mister Fathead.

Track listing
"Hard Times" (Paul Mitchell) – 4:39
"Weird Beard" (Hank Crawford) – 4:46
"Willow Weep for Me" (Ann Ronell) – 4:56
"Bill for Bennie" (Crawford) – 4:14
"Sweet Eyes" (Crawford) – 3:43
"Fathead" (Newman) – 5:20
"Mean to Me" (Fred E. Ahlert, Roy Turk) – 4:13
"Tin Tin Deo" (Gil Fuller, Chano Pozo) – 5:18

Personnel
David "Fathead" Newman – tenor saxophone (tracks 2, 4, 5, 6, 8), alto saxophone (tracks 1, 3, 7)
Ray Charles – piano
Marcus Belgrave – trumpet
Bennie (Hank) Crawford – baritone saxophone
Edgar Willis – bass
Milt Turner – drums

References

LP: Atlantic Records 1304
CD: Atlantic Jazz Masters 8122-73708-2 (2003)
CD compilation: 32 Jazz  32053
Allmusic, [ Fathead, Ray Charles Presents David 'Fathead' Newman] at allmusic.com
Allmusic, [ It's Mr. Fathead] at allmusic.com

1960 debut albums
David "Fathead" Newman albums
Atlantic Records albums
Albums produced by Jerry Wexler
Albums produced by Nesuhi Ertegun